Rakitje is a village in central Croatia located west of Zagreb. County road Ž3064 connects it to the D1 highway.

References

Populated places in Zagreb County